Contiguglia is a surname. Notable people with the surname include:

Robert Contiguglia (born 1941), American nephrologist and soccer executive
Richard and John Contiguglia, classical piano duo